715 Transvaalia is a minor planet orbiting the Sun.

The object 1911 LX discovered April 22, 1911, by H. E. Wood was named 715 Transvaalia. It was named after Transvaal, former province of South Africa. On April 23, 1920, the object 1920 GZ was discovered and named 933 Susi. In 1928 it was realized that these were one and the same object. The name Transvaalia was kept, and the name and number 933 Susi was reused for the object 1927 CH discovered February 10, 1927, by Karl Reinmuth. 715 Transvaalia has been observed to occult two stars, both events in 2022.

References

External links
 
 

Background asteroids
Transvaalia
Transvaalia
X-type asteroids (SMASS)
19110422